Anopina bloomfieldana is a moth of the family Tortricidae. It is found in Jalisco, Mexico.

References

Moths described in 2000
bloomfieldana
Moths of Central America